Dock11 (Dedicator of cytokinesis), also known as Zizimin2, is a large (~240 kDa) protein involved in intracellular signalling networks. It is a member of the DOCK-D subfamily of the DOCK family of guanine nucleotide exchange factors (GEFs) which function as activators of small G proteins. Dock11 activates the small G protein Cdc42.

Discovery 
Dock11 was identified as a protein which is highly expressed in Germinal center B lymphocytes. Subsequent RT-PCR analysis revealed expression of this protein in the spleen, thymus, bone marrow and in peripheral blood lymphocytes. Dock11 is expressed at lower levels in NIH-3T3 fibroblasts, C2C12 myoblasts and Neuro-2A neuroblastoma cells. Dock11 mRNA has also been detected in the pars intermedia.

Structure and function 
Dock11 exhibits the same domain arrangement as other members of the DOCK-D/Zizimin subfamily and shares the highest level of sequence identity with Dock9. It contains a DHR2 domain which mediates GEF activity and a DHR1 domain which may interact with membrane phospholipids. It also contains an N-terminal PH domain which may be involved in its recruitment to the plasma membrane. Dock11 binds and activates nucleotide-free Cdc42 via its DHR2 domain and has also been reported to mediate positive feedback on active, GTP-bound Cdc42, although this interaction required a small N-terminal region of Dock11 in addition to the DHR2 domain. Cdc42 in turn regulates signaling pathways that control diverse cellular functions including morphology, migration, endocytosis and cell cycle progression. Gene expression studies have suggested that Dock11 may have a role in the development of pituitary and testicular tumours.

References

Further reading